The Gansu Wind Farm Project or Jiuquan Wind Power Base is a group of large wind farms under construction in western Gansu province in China.  The Gansu Wind Farm Project is located in desert areas near the city of Jiuquan in two localities of Guazhou County and also near Yumen City, in the northwest province of Gansu, which has an abundance of wind.
In 2015 the complex was operating at below 40% utilization of the current 8 GW with a planned capacity of 20 GW. In 2017 the 2,383 km long Jiuquan - Hunan HVDC transmission line entered service connecting the remote complex to the Hunan regional grid allowing full utilization of its generation capacity. After 4 years of delays, the latest phase of construction was completed, bringing total generation capacity up to 10GW. Now, it is the world's largest wind power plant, having more than 6 times the capacity of the 2nd placed Jaisalmer Wind Park.

Overview 
The project is one of six national wind power megaprojects approved by the Chinese government. It is expected to grow to 20 gigawatts by 2020, at an estimated cost of 120 billion Chinese yuan ($17.5 billion). The project is being built by more than 20 developers in two localities in Guazhou County and also near Yumen City.

Construction phases 

The project is divided into multiple phases. The first 3,800 MW phase consisted of eighteen 200 MW wind farms and two 100 MW wind farms. The second 8,000 MW phase consists of forty 200 MW wind farms. The planned capacity was 5,160 MW by 2010, 12,710 MW by 2015 and 20,000 MW in 2020.

In 2008, construction began on a 750 kV AC power line to carry electricity from the wind farm, and construction of the wind farms themselves started in August 2009. Power in 2012 was being purchased for 0.54 yuan per kWh, compared with electricity from coal fired powerplants at 0.3 yuan per kWh. Since operations began, some 6.26 billion kWh has been generated as of October 31, 2011 with 5.96 billion kWh of that produced in 2011.

In November 2010 officials announced the completion of the project's first phase, involving the installation of over 3,500 wind turbines with an installed capacity of approximately 5,160 MW according to Wang Jianxin, director of the Jiuquan Development and Reform Commission. Total installed capacity rose to approximately 6,000 MW in March 2012—roughly equivalent to the United Kingdom's entire wind power capacity at that time.

Coordinated control centre
On March 1, 2012, a "wind power coordinated control system" was implemented to adjust the output of the 18 wind farms of the Gansu Wind Farm Project, which total 10 GW, to meet the needs of the transmission grid, which is limited to 1.5 GW. This permitted the production of 1 GWh more per day than previously, and greatly improves the system's stability.

Curtailment of wind turbine operations is a first order method for dealing with the intermittency of wind, but normally loses available output when the power grid's transmission capacity has been reached. Other methods involve either added local industrial usage or added local storage capacity.

Demand and utilization
With local-government favoritism toward coal and inadequate long-distance transmission capacity, Gansu "now has some of the highest rates of underutilization in the wind sector in China". National Energy Administration statistics showed 39 percent of wind capacity in 2015 in Jiuquan was wasted.

As of 2015, Gansu is far from full capacity and the wind farm is producing less than half of its full potential. The two main reasons why this is happening is that Gansu is located far from the major Chinese cities and that there is a lack of demand for wind energy in China.

The Gansu wind farm sits along the Gobi desert where there are extremely high winds. However, this location is about a thousand miles from China's high density port cities that would serve as the biggest consumer of this energy.
There is a lack of enough infrastructure and transmission lines that would allow the energy to flow into the cities.
There is still also little demand for wind power in China compared to coal. Although China's central government is actively trying to reduce its emissions and build its clean energy sector, the local governments still push coal on their local industries because it creates more economic output and because the coal is mined locally, which helps local coal companies.

In 2017 the 2,383 km long Jiuquan - Hunan HVDC transmission line entered service connecting the remote complex to the Hunan regional grid allowing full utilization of its generation capacity.

See also 
 List of largest power stations
 List of onshore wind farms
 List of power stations in China
 Megaproject
 Wind power in China

References 

Wind farms in China
Engineering projects